The college football recruiting class of 2023 refers to the recruiting of high school athletes to play college football starting in the fall of 2023. The scope of this article covers: (a) the colleges and universities with recruiting classes ranking among the top 25 in the country as assessed by at least one of the major media outlets, and (b) the individual recruits ranking among the top 25 in the country as assessed by at least one of the major media outlets.

Top ranked classes

Top ranked recruits
The following individuals were rated by one of the major media outlets among the top  20 players in the country in the Class of 2023. They are listed in order of their highest ranking by any of the major media outlets.

References

Recruiting class
Recruiting class